Sangay Khandu (born 7 September 1985) is a Bhutanese international footballer. He made his first appearance for the Bhutan national football team in 2009.

References

Bhutan international footballers
Bhutanese footballers
Transport United F.C. players
Living people
1985 births
Association football defenders